Antônio Reginaldo Pizzonia Júnior (born 11 September 1980) is a Brazilian professional racing driver who has raced in Formula One and the Champ Car World Series. Born in Manaus, he started his car racing career in the Formula Vauxhall Junior series in 1997 and then progressed through various junior formulae, winning the Formula Vauxhall Junior Winter Festival in 1997, the Formula Vauxhall Junior and Formula Renault Winter Festival in 1998, the Formula Renault 2.0 UK in 1999, and the British Formula 3 Championship in 2000.

For 2001 and 2002, he entered the Formula 3000, with his best championship finish being sixth in 2001. In 2003, he was signed by the Jaguar Formula One team, but following poor results, was released during the season. In 2004, he replaced the injured Ralf Schumacher at Williams in several events, securing his first Formula One points in the process.

In 2005, he replaced Nick Heidfeld at Williams, but was released from his contract at the end of the season. Since then, he has competed in multiple series, such as the Champ Car World Series, the Superleague Formula, Stock Car Brasil, and the FIA GT1 World Championship.

Racing career

Pre-Formula One
From 1991 to 1996 he competed in various karting series. In 1997 he moved to Britain and competed in Formula Vauxhall Junior; Pizzonia placed second, and won the Winter Festival. In 1998, in addition to taking the Championship in Formula Vauxhall Junior, he won the Formula Renault Winter Festival.

His 1999 season was even more successful, winning the Formula Renault 2.0 UK series and finishing second in the Formula Renault 2.0 Eurocup. In 2000, Pizzonia took five wins on his way to winning the British Formula 3 Championship. For 2001, Pizzonia switched to the Formula 3000 series, winning one race and finishing sixth in the championship.

Formula One
In 2002, Pizzonia was hired as test driver for Williams, but also continued in F3000, placing 8th. After impressive testing performances, he was signed by the Jaguar team to partner Mark Webber for 2003, replacing the axed Pedro de la Rosa
. However, following a string of poor results, he was dropped late in the season and replaced by Minardi's Justin Wilson.

In 2004 he returned to Williams as test driver. Before the German Grand Prix, it was announced that Pizzonia would take over from Marc Gené, who had been filling in for the injured Ralf Schumacher. At the German Grand Prix, he finished 7th to take his first 2 career points; he repeated the feat at the Hungarian Grand Prix.

In Belgium, he briefly led an F1 race for the first time, but failed to finish the race due to a gearbox problem, whilst running in 3rd place. He claimed a further 2 points in Italy (during which he achieved the fastest ever recorded top speed in a F1 race at the time, 369.9 km/h, until Juan Pablo Montoya eclipsed this record the following year), but with the announcement of Ralf Schumacher's return for the Chinese Grand Prix, Pizzonia's racing was over for the year.

Prior to the 2005 season, Pizzonia was in a virtual shoot-out with German Nick Heidfeld for the second race seat at Williams alongside Webber. Despite Pizzonia's experience with the team and financial support from Petrobras, Heidfeld was given the seat.

Pizzonia was still employed at Williams as a test driver, and when Heidfeld complained of headaches after being concussed in a crash during the Friday Practice Session at Monza, Pizzonia gained the chance to race. Having not entered an F1 race since the 2004 Italian Grand Prix, the Brazilian qualified 16th, coming through the field to emulate his 2004 race result — picking up 7th place and 2 points. He then raced in the Belgian Grand Prix. where he incurred a fine for taking out 2nd placed Juan Pablo Montoya just a few laps from the end. Pizzonia also took the drive in the Brazilian Grand Prix, but his race was over before the first corner after taking out his own teammate Mark Webber resulting from a collision with David Coulthard.

Despite some speculation that GP2 champion Nico Rosberg would be given an opportunity in the last two races of the season, Pizzonia completed the season for Williams. He retired from the Japanese Grand Prix early after spinning off, and retired from (but was classified as a finisher in) the Chinese Grand Prix after a puncture. Having been replaced by Nico Rosberg for 2006, Pizzonia's Formula One career was over.

Post-Formula One

In 2006, he drove for Paul Gentilozzi's Rocketsports team in the Champ Car World Series' Long Beach Grand Prix and returned to the team towards the end of the season for races where Tõnis Kasemets did not have sponsorship to race.

In 2007, Pizzonia was racing for Fisichella Motor Sport in the GP2 series. In May, he was dropped in favour of Adam Carroll after only scoring 1 point in 5 races. After that, he returned to Brazil and entered into competition in Stock Car Brasil, a Brazilian national championship, from July. He has competed in the series every year since then, and has also raced in Superleague Formula (SC Corinthians) and the FIA GT1 World Championship.

In 2012, Pizzonia made a one-off guest appearance in the Auto GP World Series when the championship visited the Brazilian Curitiba circuit. Driving for the Ombra Racing team, he won both races, immediately slotting himself into ninth position in the championship.

In 2014 and 2015, Pizzonia competed in the Auto GP series, with Zele Racing.

Racing record

Career summary

Complete International Formula 3000 results
(key) (Races in bold indicate pole position) (Races in italics indicate fastest lap)

Complete Formula One results
(key)

 Driver did not finish the Grand Prix, but was classified as he completed over 90% of the race distance.

American open wheel Racing
(key)

Complete Champ Car results

IndyCar

¹ Run on same day
² Non-points-paying, exhibition race

Complete GP2 Series results
(key) (Races in bold indicate pole position) (Races in italics indicate fastest lap)

Superleague Formula

2008–2009
(key) (Races in bold indicate pole position) (Races in italics indicate fastest lap)

2009 Super Final Results
Super Final results in 2009 did not count for points towards the main championship.

2011
(key) (Races in bold indicate pole position) (Races in italics indicate fastest lap)

Brazilian competitions

Stock Car Brasil

† Ineligible for championship points.

Complete Auto GP results
(key) (Races in bold indicate pole position) (Races in italics indicate fastest lap)

‡ Position when season was cancelled.

Complete FIA World Endurance Championship results

References

External links

News of Antônio Pizzonia (Article)
Antonio Pizzonia on YouTube
Antonio Pizzonia on Instagram

1980 births
Living people
People from Manaus
Brazilian people of Italian descent
British Formula Renault 2.0 drivers
Brazilian Formula One drivers
Jaguar Formula One drivers
Williams Formula One drivers
Brazilian Champ Car drivers
Brazilian IndyCar Series drivers
GP2 Series drivers
Brazilian GP2 Series drivers
International Formula 3000 drivers
Superleague Formula drivers
British Formula Three Championship drivers
Stock Car Brasil drivers
FIA GT1 World Championship drivers
Brazilian expatriate sportspeople in the United Kingdom
Auto GP drivers
FIA World Endurance Championship drivers
Rolex Sports Car Series drivers
American Le Mans Series drivers
Manor Motorsport drivers
Sportspeople from Amazonas (Brazilian state)
Ombra Racing drivers
Scuderia Coloni drivers
EuroInternational drivers
Alan Docking Racing drivers
Conquest Racing drivers
Rocketsports Racing drivers